Walter Davies Burleigh (7 June 1886 – 7 August 1948) was an Australian rules footballer who played with Collingwood in the Victorian Football League (VFL).

Notes

External links 

Wal Burleigh's profile at Collingwood Forever

1886 births
1948 deaths
Australian rules footballers from Victoria (Australia)
Collingwood Football Club players